Coastal Forces was a division of the Royal Navy initially established during World War I, and then again in World War II under the command of Rear-Admiral, Coastal Forces. It remained active until the last minesweepers to wear the "HM Coastal Forces" cap tally were taken out of reserve in 1968.  On 21 May 2020, ministerial approval for the change in name from 1st Patrol Boat Squadron to Coastal Forces Squadron was given. It encompasses the Archer-class patrol vessels and the Batch 1 River-class offshore patrol vessels and are responsible for UKEEZ Protection and Patrol.

History

Predecessor
The Royal Navy had previously operated flotillas of small torpedo- and depth-charge-armed craft (coastal motor boats) during World War I (1914-1918). They operated as often in action against the enemy coast as in defence of British coastal areas.

Establishment
The first post WWI motor torpedo boats built for the Royal Navy were built by the British Powerboat Company at Hythe, Southampton. MTBs 01-19 were built between 1935 and 1938, following the hard chine planing hull designed with T E Lawrence ("Lawrence of Arabia"), for high speed rescue of downed aircraft crew.

The chief staff officer to the admiral was Augustus Agar, VC, who had commanded coastal motor boats during World War I and in British operations in the Baltic Sea in 1918 and 1919 in support of White Russian forces during the Russian Civil War.

World War II operations
Royal Navy Coastal Forces craft operated mainly in the English Channel and North Sea waters.

On 19 December 1941 MTB 07 led the attack on Japanese landing craft in Kowloon Harbour, Hong Kong, taking fire from land, sea and air. The operation was arguably the most daring daylight MTB raid of all time losing over 40% of the flotilla. MTB 07 was hit 97 times losing two crew dead and all three engines. It was hailed as the "Balaclava of the sea".

They were also used in the Mediterranean and off the Norwegian coastline. They were used at the St. Nazaire Raid and the Dieppe Raid. They were used to attack German convoys and their S-boat (known to the Allies as "E-Boat") escorts, carry out clandestine raids and landings, and pick up secret agents in Norway and Brittany. Alongside British officers and men, the coastal craft were manned by various Allied nationalities including Dutch, Norwegian, Canadian, Australian, and New Zealanders.

A number of Captain-class frigates were configured to operate as "coastal forces control frigates" (CFCF). Operating with Coastal Forces officers embarked and responsible for controlling and providing radar support to groups of Coastal Forces' motor torpedo boats intercepting German motor torpedo boats in the North Sea, these frigates were involved in the destruction of at least 26 E-Boats.

By 1944 Coastal Forces numbered 3,000 officers and 22,000 ratings. Altogether there were 2,000 British Coastal Forces craft. Affectionately known as the Royal Navy's "little ships", they fought over 900 actions and sank around 400 enemy vessels, including 48 E-boats and 32 midget submarines. They fired 1,169 torpedoes, shot down 32 enemy aircraft and carried out many mine laying operations. 170 of the "little ships" were sunk or otherwise destroyed.

Post-World War II
After World War II, the Royal Navy re-designated all its motor torpedo boats (MTBs) and motor gun boats (MGBs) as "fast patrol boats." The Brave-class fast patrol boats were the last craft to be built for the Coastal Forces, and the Coastal Forces were disbanded as a separate unit and their last base,, decommissioned in 1956.

Craft types used 
Coastal Forces included the following types of coastal defence craft:

These could typically maintain 40 knots and were armed with two torpedo tubes. They were built mainly by the British Power Boat Company, Vospers, and Thornycroft.

In 1940 a modified craft, the motor gun boat (MGB), was introduced. These were armed with weapons such as the  0.5 in (12.7 mm) Vickers machine gun, 2 pounder (40 mm) "pom pom", a single or twin 20 mm Oerlikon cannon and ultimately the 6-pounder (57 mm) gun with autoloader.

It was also apparent that larger craft were needed as the operational capability of the short boats was too restricted by sea conditions. The Fairmile A Type and B Type were Motor Launches and the C Type was a motor gun boat.

In 1943 the  Fairmile D Type appeared. It was a motor torpedo boat – nicknamed the "Dog Boat" – and was designed as a counter to the German S-boat (known to the Allies as the "E-boat"). It could be fitted as either a gun or a torpedo boat, so the designation MGB and MTB tended to be intermixed or 'MGB/MTB' used. It was a good sea boat and could maintain  at full load. The later D types carried four  torpedo tubes.

The Vosper Type I MTB appeared in 1943.

Bases
Coastal Forces bases were located around the British coast and at major locations overseas.

South coast
 HMS Attack, Portland
 HMS Bee, then HMS Grasshopper, Weymouth
 HMS Bee, Weymouth 1942–1943
 HMS Bee, Holyhead 1943–1945
 HMS Black Bat, Plymouth
 HMS Hornet, Haslar, Gosport
 HMS Tadpole, Poole
 HMS Wasp, Dover Coastal Forces

West coast
 HMS Ferret II Port of Londonderry, Northern Ireland
 HMS Seahawk Ardrishaig, Argyll
  Fort William, Inverness-shire

East Coast
 , Harwich
 HMS Beehive, Felixstowe
 HMS Midge, Great Yarmouth
 HMS Minos II, then HMS Mantis, Lowestoft
 HMS Sandfly, Peterhead
 HMS Flora II, Invergordon
 HMS Flora III, Invergordon

Mediterranean
 HMS Gregale, Malta
 , HMS Regea, Alexandria, Egypt
 HMS Razorbill, Algiers
 , Algiers
Indo-china
 HMIS Cheetah, Bombay (Royal Indian Navy)

Other
 HMS Argyll
 , Newhaven, Sussex 
 HMS Beaver II, Immingham 
 HMS Britannia III, Dartmouth 
 HMS Cicala, Dartmouth
 , Leith 
 HMS Dartmouth II, Dartmouth 
 HMS Fervent, Ramsgate 
 HMS Forte IV, Falmouth 
 HMS Forward II, Newhaven
 HMS Fox Lerwick
 , Royal Naval Dockyard, Bermuda

Commonwealth coastal forces
Although British Commonwealth coastal forces operated independently from British ones, they used similar vessels:

Surviving craft

Some surviving motor launches in British waters were taken on as pleasure boats and a number of them are on the National Register of Historic Vessels.

See also

 Royal Naval Patrol Service 
 Trawlers of the Royal Navy
 Coastal Forces of World War II
 Coastal Forces of the Royal Canadian Navy
 Coastal Forces of the Royal Australian Navy
 Coastal Forces of the Royal New Zealand Navy
Robert Peverell Hichens RNVR MTB Flotilla leader

References

Notes

Bibliography

 Cooper, Bryan. (1972) Battle of the Torpedo Boats. 
 Holman, Gordon (1944) The Little Ships. London: Hodder & Stroughton OCLC 2300084
 Konstam, Angus (2003) British Motor Torpedo Boat 1939–45. Osprey 
 Lambert, John and Ross, Al (1990) Allied Coastal Forces of World War II, Volume I: Fairmile designs and US Submarine Chasers. 
 Lavery, Brian (2006) Churchill's Navy: The Ships, Men and Organisation, 1939-1945, 

 Kemp, Paul J (1997)  British Coastal Forces of WWII, ISO Publications, London,  
 
 Pickles, Harold (1995)  Untold Stories of Small Boats at War: Coastal Forces Veterans Remember 
 Pope, Dudley (2006) Flag 4: The Battle of Coastal Forces in the Mediterranean 1939-1945. 
 Reynolds, L.C. and Cooper, H.F. (1999) Mediterranean MTBs at War: Short MTB Flotilla Operations, 1939-45. 
 Reynolds, L. C. (2000) Home Waters MTBs at War: Channel and North Sea MTB and MGB Flotilla Operations, 1939-1945.   
 Reynolds, L. C. and Lord Lewin (2000) Dog Boats at War: A History of the Operations of the Royal Navy D Class Fairmile Motor Torpedo Boats and Motor Gunboats 1939-1945, Sutton Publications Inc, 
 Reynolds, L. C. (2002) Motor Gunboat 658: The Small Boat War in the Mediterranean. 
 Scott, Peter and Hichens, Antony (2009) The Battle of the Narrow Seas: A History of the Light Coastal Forces in the Channel and North Sea, 1939-1945 (reprint) Naval Institute Press. .

Further reading
 
 Royal Naval Museum  -  Reading list
 Coastal Forces Heritage Trust - Books About Coastal Forces

External links
 Royal Navy Coastal Forces Veterans
 Coastal, inshore and special naval warfare
 The Coastal Forces Heritage Trust
 British Military Powerboat Trust: Boat Histories
 Coastal Forces, Clandestine Naval Ops and Landing Craft
 Coastal Forces
 UK National Register of Historic Vessels
 Royal Navy Coastal Forces training base, mainly for MLs  
 Royal Navy Coastal Warfare Vessels Lost at Sea  
 Motor launches and MTBs of the Coastal Forces
 Personal recollections 

Naval units and formations of the United Kingdom
Military units and formations of the Royal Navy in World War II
World War II torpedo boats
World War II gunboats